CSAC may refer to:

Czecho Slovakian Activist Crew
California State Athletic Commission
 California Student Aid Commission
Colonial States Athletic Conference
California State Association of Counties
Citizens' Stamp Advisory Committee
Chip-scale atomic clock
Clinical Substance Abuse Counselor